Glyptothorax alidaeii is a species of fish in the family Sisoridae.

The species live in western Iran and was named after footballer Ali Daei.

References

alidaeii
Taxa named by Hamed Mousavi-Sabet
Taxa named by Soheil Eagderi
Taxa named by Saber Vatandoust
Taxa named by Jörg Freyhof
Fish described in 2021
Fish of Iran